"Those Were the Days" is a song credited to Gene Raskin, who put a new English lyric to the Russian romance song "Дорогой длинною" (Romance transliteration "Dorogoj dlinnoju", literally "By the long road"), composed by Boris Fomin (1900–1948) with words by the poet Konstantin Podrevsky. It deals with reminiscence upon youth and romantic idealism. It also deals with tavern activities, which include drinking, singing and dancing.

Mary Hopkin's 1968 debut single of "Those Were the Days", which was produced by Paul McCartney of the Beatles, and arranged by Richard Hewson, became a number one hit on the UK Singles Chart and on the Canadian RPM Magazine charts. The song also reached number two on the Billboard Hot 100, behind "Hey Jude" by the Beatles. It was number one in the first edition of the French National Hit Parade launched by the Centre d'Information et de Documentation du Disque. The song was featured on the US debut album which excluded some tracks missing from the  UK LP Post Card but was omitted from the U.K. release

Early history
Georgian singer Tamara Tsereteli (1900–1968) and Russian singer Alexander Vertinsky made what were probably the earliest recordings of the song, in 1925 and 1926 respectively.

The song appears in the 1953 British/French movie Innocents in Paris, in which it was sung with its original Russian lyrics by the Russian Tzigane chanteuse Ludmila Lopato. Mary Hopkin's 1968 recording of it with Gene Raskin's lyric was a chart-topping hit in much of the Northern Hemisphere. On most recordings of the song, Raskin is credited as the sole writer, even though he wrote only the later English lyrics (which are not an English translation of the Russian lyrics) and not the music.

Later history
In the early 1960s Raskin, with his wife Francesca, played folk music around Greenwich Village in New York, including White Horse Tavern. Raskin, who had grown up hearing the song, wrote with his wife, new English lyrics to the old Russian music and then copyrighted both music and lyrics in his own name. The Limeliters subsequently released a recording of the song on their 1962 LP Folk Matinee. The Raskins were international performers and had played London's "Blue Angel" every year, always closing their show with the song. Paul McCartney frequented the club and, being quite taken with the song, he attempted to get several singers or groups (including the early Moody Blues) to record it. Failing at that, after the formation of the Beatles' own Apple Records label, McCartney immediately recorded Mary Hopkin performing the song at Abbey Road Studios in London. He later said, "I thought it was very catchy, it had something, it was a good treatment of nostalgia... (Hopkin) picked it up very easily, as if she'd known it for years." The song was eventually recorded in over twenty languages and by many different artists, including Gene and Francesca.

Hopkin's recording was produced by Paul McCartney with an arrangement by Richard Hewson and became a number-one hit on the UK Singles Chart. In the United States, Hopkin's recording reached number two on the Billboard Hot 100 (held out of the top spot for three weeks by "Hey Jude" by The Beatles) and topped the Billboard Easy Listening charts for six weeks. In the Netherlands, it topped the charts for two consecutive weeks. The Russian origin of the melody was accentuated by an instrumentation that was unusual for a top-ten pop record, including balalaika, clarinet, hammered dulcimer or cimbalom, tenor banjo and children's chorus, giving a klezmer feel to the song. Mary Hopkin played acoustic guitar on the recording, and Paul McCartney also played acoustic guitar and possibly percussion. The cimbalom was played by Gilbert Webster.

McCartney also recorded Hopkin singing "Those Were the Days" in other languages for release in their respective countries:
In Spain, Qué tiempo tan feliz
In West Germany, An jenem Tag
In Italy, Quelli erano giorni
In France, Le temps des fleurs

The non-English sets of lyrics were also recorded by Dalida and Sandie Shaw, with Shaw recording the English lyrics as well.

The UK and United States recording's B-side was Pete Seeger's "Turn! Turn! Turn!", which had been a United States number-one hit for The Byrds in 1965.

"Those Were the Days" was catalogue number APPLE 2. (The APPLE 1 number had been given to an unreleased version of Frank Sinatra's "The Lady Is a Tramp", recorded specially in 1968, for Maureen Starkey's 22nd birthday, as a gift from Ringo Starr, under the name of "The Lady is a Champ".) It was the second single to be released on the Apple label, the first— "Hey Jude" by the Beatles—had retained the sequential catalogue numbers used by Parlophone (in the UK) and Capitol (in the US).

Hopkin's version was released on the back of her success on the television talent show Opportunity Knocks and, around the time of its release, popular singer Sandie Shaw was also asked to record the song by her management, feeling that it should be done by a "real" singer. Shaw's version was released as a single, but did not match the success of Hopkin's version.

At the peak of the song's success, a New York company used the melody in a commercial for Rokeach gefilte fish, arguing that the tune was an old Russian folk-tune and thus in the public domain. (The commercial included the line "The perfect dish, Rokeach Gefilte Fish" where the English-language song would go "Those were the days, oh yes, those were the days.") Raskin successfully sued and won a settlement, since he had slightly altered the tune to fit his lyrics and had taken out the valid new copyright.

In the mid-1970s, after Hopkin's contract with Apple ended, "Those Were the Days" and "Goodbye" were re-recorded with producer Tony Visconti, whom she had married in 1971. These re-recorded versions can be found on music compilations.

On 25 October 2010, Apple Records released Come and Get It: The Best of Apple Records, which included the original recordings of "Those Were the Days" and "Goodbye". The greatest hits compilation album contained songs by artists signed to the Beatles' Apple record label between 1968 and 1973, the first such multi-artist Apple compilation.

On Christmas 1969, the President of Equatorial Guinea, Francisco Macías Nguema, had 150 alleged coup plotters executed in the national stadium while the amplifier system played the Mary Hopkin's recording of "Those Were the Days".

The tune of "Those Were the Days" is used for the Republic of Ireland football chant "Come On You Boys in Green".

In 2011, Hopkin's version of the song was used by Nando's South Africa in a satirical advert featuring Robert Mugabe as the 'Last Dictator Standing'. The advert was axed quickly, due to controversy and condemnation from pro-Mugabe loyalists.

Charts (Mary Hopkin version)

Weekly charts

Year-end charts

Other recordings

1968: a Finnish version of the song, "Oi niitä aikoja", was released by the Finnish singer Päivi Paunu

In 1968 American singer Johnny Mathis released the album "Those Were The Days" which featured the title song as the first track

See also
Apple Records discography
List of Cash Box Top 100 number-one singles of 1968
List of number-one adult contemporary singles of 1968 (U.S.)
List of number-one singles of 1968 (Canada)
List of number-one hits of 1968 (Germany)
List of number-one singles of 1968 (Ireland)
List of number-one singles of 1968 (Spain)
List of number-one singles from 1968 to 1979 (Switzerland) 
List of Oricon number-one singles of 1969
List of UK charts and number-one singles (1952–1969)
VG-lista 1964 to 1994

References

External links
Several Russian songs, including Дорогой длинною
Those were the days on song facts
Discography of "Дорогой длинною" song on Russian-Records.com
Site with lyrics

1968 debut singles
Mary Hopkin songs
Dolly Parton songs
Sandie Shaw songs
Song recordings produced by Paul McCartney
Apple Records singles
Pye Records singles
Cashbox number-one singles
Irish Singles Chart number-one singles
Number-one singles in France
Number-one singles in Germany
Number-one singles in Norway
Number-one singles in Spain
Number-one singles in Switzerland
Oricon Weekly number-one singles
RPM Top Singles number-one singles
Songs about nostalgia
UK Singles Chart number-one singles
Ultratop 50 Singles (Flanders) number-one singles